Chharra Rafatpur is a town and a nagar panchayat in Aligarh district  in the state of Uttar Pradesh, India.

Demographics
As of 2011 Indian Census, Chharra Rafatpur had a total population of 21,146, of which 11,052 were males and 10,094 were females. Population within the age group of 0 to 6 years was 3,044. The total number of literates in Chharra Rafatpur was 11,296, which constituted 53.4% of the population with male literacy of 60.3% and female literacy of 45.9%. The effective literacy rate of 7+ population of Chharra Rafatpur was 62.4%, of which male literacy rate was 70.5% and female literacy rate was 53.6%. The Scheduled Castes population was 1,677. Chharra Rafatpur had 3274 households in 2011.

Transportation
Chharra Rafatpur is 40 km from district headquarters Aligarh, Uttar Pradesh, India.  The only way to commute to this place is by road.

External links
Uttar Pradesh Assembly Elections
Chharra Assembly Elections

References

Cities and towns in Aligarh district